Sukjong is the temple name of several Korean kings. It can refer to:
 Sukjong of Goryeo (1095-1105)
 Sukjong of Joseon (1674–1720)

Temple name disambiguation pages